Lepidoptera of France consist of both the butterflies and moths recorded from Metropolitan France.

According to a recent estimate, there are a total of 5,109 Lepidoptera species present in France, including Corsica and Monaco.

Butterflies

Moths

External links 
Fauna Europaea

Lepidoptera
 France
Lepidop